Liam Gill (born 30 July 2003) is a Canadian snowboarder who competes internationally in the half-pipe discipline.

Career 
Gill first represented Canada at the 2020 Winter Youth Olympics, where he competed in three events: slopestyle (11th), halfpipe (13th) and big air (8th).

On January 31, 2022, Gill was named to Canada's 2022 Olympic team in the halfpipe event as an injury replacement for Derek Livingston.

Gill is a part of the Łı́ı́dlı̨ı̨ Kų́ę́ First Nation and will be the only male First Nations athlete from Canada at the 2022 Winter Olympics.

References

External links 
 

2003 births
Living people
Canadian male snowboarders
Sportspeople from Calgary
Snowboarders at the 2020 Winter Youth Olympics
Snowboarders at the 2022 Winter Olympics
Olympic snowboarders of Canada